Oleg II may refer to:

 Oleg II Svyatoslavich, Prince of Novgorod-Seversk until 1180
 Oleg II, Grand Prince of Riazan (r. 1389–1402), the Great